Sande is a municipality in the district of Friesland, Lower Saxony, Germany.

Sande is on the railway which links Oldenburg to Wilhelmshaven and Esens. A bypass is planned so that rail traffic for the JadeWeserPort will not pass through the centre of Sande.

References

Friesland (district)